Amazilia is a hummingbird genus in the subfamily Trochilinae. It is found in tropical Central and South America.

Taxonomy 
The genus Amazilia was introduced in 1843 by the French naturalist René Lesson. Lesson had used amazilia in 1827 as the specific epithet of the amazilia hummingbird which is now the only species placed in the genus Amazilis. The name comes from the Inca heroine in Jean-François Marmontel's novel Les Incas, ou la destruction de l'Empire du Pérou. The type species was subsequently designated as the cinnamon hummingbird.

The genus contains five species:
 Rufous-tailed hummingbird, Amazilia tzacatl
 Buff-bellied hummingbird, Amazilia yucatanensis Cinnamon hummingbird, Amazilia rutila Mangrove hummingbird, Amazilia boucardi 
 Honduran emerald, Amazilia luciaeAn additional species is sometimes included:
 Guanacaste hummingbird, Amazilia alfaroana (disputed)

This genus formerly included many more species. A molecular phylogenetic study published in 2014 found that the large genus was polyphyletic. In the revised classification to create monophyletic genera, species were moved to Leucolia, Saucerottia, Amazilis, Uranomitra, Chrysuronia, Polyerata, Chionomesa, Elliotomyia  and Chlorestes''.

References

 
Bird genera
Taxa named by René Lesson
Taxonomy articles created by Polbot